Andrew Smith (born 1 November 1978 in Wollongong, New South Wales) is a former field hockey striker from Australia.  He played in two games at the 2008 Beijing Games, where the Kookaburras won the bronze medal. From 2011 until 2020 he was employed as a teacher and head coach of the hockey program at Maribyrnong College. He was employed as a Physical Education teacher at the start of 2021 for Nhulunbuy Christian College in Nhulunbuy.

References

 Profile on Hockey Australia

External links
 

1978 births
Australian male field hockey players
Male field hockey forwards
Field hockey players from Melbourne
Living people
2002 Men's Hockey World Cup players
Field hockey players at the 2008 Summer Olympics
Olympic field hockey players of Australia
Olympic bronze medalists for Australia
Sportspeople from Wollongong
Olympic medalists in field hockey
Medalists at the 2008 Summer Olympics
Sportsmen from Victoria (Australia)
Australian schoolteachers